= Age bias =

Age bias may refer to:

- Ageism, stereotyping or discrimination based on age
- Age bias (medicine), treatment of a patient based predominantly on patient's age
- Age bias (employment), age discrimination in workforce
