= Age bias (medicine) =

Inappropriate use of age as a sole criterion for medical decisions

In health care management, age bias is a shift in handling of a patient based solely on patient's age while disregarding their physical condition. This may result in undertreatment of reasonably healthy but very old persons. For example, older cancer patients may be undertreated on an unjustified assumption that a treatment is unsafe for older patients. Conversely, age bias may lead to overtreatment of a moderately old person in generally poor health.

Another form of age bias is age discrimination in the framework of health care. The negative-leaning attitude towards older adults reported for the Western cultures may gain in influence in health care when combined with some other considerations, such as poor motivation or poor prognosis. It is suggested that this may happen because therapists are driven by the desire to help people in a noticeable way, and old people are perceived to have a low potential in this respect.
